Eating invasive species has been suggested by people such as ecologist Joe Roman as a way of reducing their numbers.  This is a list of cases where this has been suggested, tried and/or is now established.

Plants

 Autumn olive (Elaeagnus umbellata) 
 Jackfruit (Artocarpus heterophyllus)
 Water hyacinth (Eichhornia crassipes)
 Garlic mustard (Alliaria petiolata)
 Palmer's amaranth (Amaranthus palmeri)
 Kudzu (Pueraria spp.)
 Armenian blackberry (Rubus armeniacus)
 Dandelion (Taraxacum spp.)
Water caltrop (Trapa spp.)
Burdock (Arctium spp.)
Japanese knotweed (Reynoutria japonica spp.)
Wintercress (Barbarea vulgaris spp.)
 Wild parsnip

Animals

American bullfrog (Lithobates catesbeianus)
Asian carp
Brook trout (Salvelinus fontinalis)
Brown trout (Salmo trutta)
Rainbow trout (Oncorhynchus mykiss)
Cane toad (Rhinella marina)
Green shore crab (Carcinus maenas)
Chinese mitten crab (Eriocheir sinensis)
Common carp (Cyprinus carpio)
Eurasian ruffe (Gymnocephalus cernua)
Domestic pig (Sus scrofa domesticus)
Domestic rabbit (Oryctolagus cuniculus domesticus)
Goat (Capra aegagrus hircus)
Giant Snakehead (Channa micropeltes)
Nutria (Myocastor coypus)
Green iguana (Iguana iguana)
Largemouth bass (Micropterus salmoides)
Signal crayfish (Pacifastacus leniusculus)
Mediterranean mussel (Mytilus galloprovincialis)
Mozambique tilapia (Oreochromis mossambicus)
Nile perch (Lates niloticus)
Lionfish (Pterois spp.)
Quagga mussel (Dreissena rostriformis)
Zebra mussel (Dreissena polymorpha)
Walking catfish (Clarias batrachus)
Snails

See also
Lists of invasive species

References

edible
Food- and drink-related lists